Unstoppable is a 2010 American disaster action thriller film directed and produced by Tony Scott and starring Denzel Washington and Chris Pine. It is based on the real-life CSX 8888 incident, telling the story of a runaway freight train and the two men who attempt to stop it. It was the last film Tony Scott directed before his death in 2012.

The film was released in the United States and Canada on November 12, 2010. It received generally positive reviews from critics and grossed $167 million against a production budget between $85–100 million. It was nominated for an Oscar for Best Sound Editing at the 83rd Academy Awards, but lost to Inception.

Plot
While two yard hostlers are moving a mixed-freight Allegheny and West Virginia Railroad (AWVR) train at Fuller Yard in northern Pennsylvania, Dewey, the engineer, realizes that a trailing-point switch ahead is not correctly aligned and leaves the cab of lead locomotive 777 to change it, setting the throttle to idle. However, the throttle pops into full throttle before he can get back on, leaving the train unattended going south at full speed down the mainline.

Believing the train is coasting, Dewey calls yardmaster Connie Hooper, who orders lead welder Ned Oldham to get ahead of the train in his pickup truck and switch it off the main track, but when he arrives to find that the train has already passed, they realize it is running on full power. Connie alerts Oscar Galvin, VP of Train Operations, and contacts local, county, and state police, asking them to block all level crossings, while Ned continues to chase 777 in his truck. Federal Railroad Administration inspector Scott Werner, while visiting Fuller Yard to meet with students on the Railroad Safety Campaign excursion train (RSC 2002), warns that eight of 777's 39 freight cars contain highly toxic and flammable molten phenol, which would cause a major disaster if the train should derail in a populated area.

Connie suggests they purposely derail the train while it passes through unpopulated farmland. Galvin dismisses her opinion, believing he can save the railroad money by lashing the train behind two locomotives 7375+7346 helmed by veteran engineer Judd Stewart, slowing it down enough for employee and former U.S. Marine Ryan Scott to descend from a helicopter to the control cab of 777. However, Ryan is knocked unconscious during the attempt when 777 suddenly lunges forward as he touches down. Stewart attempts to divert 777 to a siding but fails, he is killed when his locomotives derail at a switch and the diesel fuel ignites, destroying the lash-up locomotives. Galvin Realizes that 777 will derail on the Stanton Curve, near the heavily-populated Southern Pennsylvania town of Stanton, and decides to derail the runaway just north of the smaller town of Arklow.

Meanwhile, veteran AWVR railroad engineer Frank Barnes and conductor Will Colson, a new hire preoccupied with a restraining order from his wife Darcy, are pulling 25 cars with locomotive 1206 on the same line going north. Ordered onto a siding off the mainline, they narrowly pull into a RIP track before 777 races by, smashing through their last boxcar. Frank observes that 777's last car has an open coupler and proposes that they travel in reverse and attempt to couple their engine to the runaway, using 1206's brakes to slow down 777 before it reaches the Stanton Curve. Will uncouples their own cars while Frank reports his plan to Connie and Galvin, warning that Galvin's idea of using portable derailers will not work given 777's momentum. Galvin threatens to fire Frank, who informs Galvin that he is already being forced into early retirement. Galvin threatens to fire Will as well, but the men ignore him and pursue 777.

As Frank predicted, the train barrels through the portable derailers unhindered, to Galvin's horror. Knowing that Frank's plan is their only chance at preventing disaster, Connie and Werner take control of the situation from Galvin. Meanwhile, Darcy learns from her sister about Will's involvement in the chase, while Frank's daughters learn of their father's involvement from television news coverage at the Hooters where they both work.

Frank and Will catch up to 777's trailing hopper car and attempt to engage the coupler. When the locking pin will not engage, Will kicks it into place, but his foot gets crushed in the process. Will hobbles back to 1206's cab, and Frank tries to slow 777 with the independent brakes, but makes little headway with 777 still under power. Will stays in the cab to work the dynamic brakes and throttle while Frank works his way along the top of 777's cars in a risky attempt to engage the handbrakes on each car. Eventually, 1206's brakes burn out and the train starts gaining speed again. Using the independent air brake, Will coordinates brake timing with Frank and they manage to reduce speed enough to clear the Stanton Curve (B & O Railroad Viaduct). As 777 picks up speed, Frank finds the path to 777's cab blocked. Ned arrives in his truck on a road parallel to the tracks, and Will jumps onto the bed of Ned's truck. Ned races to the front of 777 where Will leaps onto the locomotive, reduces the throttle to idle, and applies the brakes, finally bringing the runaway train to a safe stop. Darcy arrives with Will's son and reunites with him and Connie comes to congratulate the men, who are hailed as heroes.

Before the closing credits, it's revealed that Frank was promoted and later retires with full benefits. Will is happily married to Darcy (who is currently expecting their second child), recovers from his injuries, and continues working with AWVR. Connie is promoted to Galvin's VP position, while it’s implied Galvin was fired for his poor handling of the incident, costing the railroad money and equipment and causing Stewart’s death. Ryan makes a full recovery, and Dewey, who is held liable for causing the situation, is fired from his job and goes on to work in the fast-food industry.

Cast
 Denzel Washington as Frank Barnes, a veteran railroad engineer.
 Chris Pine as Will Colson, a young train conductor.
 Rosario Dawson as Connie Hooper, the yardmaster of Fuller Yard.
 Ethan Suplee as Dewey, a hostler who accidentally instigates the disaster.
 Kevin Dunn as Oscar Galvin, vice-president of AWVR train operations.
 Kevin Corrigan as Inspector Scott Werner, an FRA inspector who helps Frank, Will, and Connie.
 Kevin Chapman as Bunny, a railroad operations dispatcher for Fuller Yard.
 Lew Temple as Ned Oldham, a railroad lead welder.
 T. J. Miller as Gilleece, Dewey's conductor, also a hostler.
 Jessy Schram as Darcy Colson, Will's estranged wife.
 David Warshofsky as Judd Stewart, a veteran engineer who is friends with Frank & dies in an attempt to slow the runaway train.
 Andy Umberger as Janeway, the president of AWVR.
 Elizabeth Mathis as Nicole Barnes, Frank's daughter who works as a waitress at Hooters.
 Meagan Tandy as Maya Barnes, Frank's daughter who works as a waitress at Hooters.
 Aisha Hinds as a Railroad Safety Campaign coordinator in an excursion train to Fuller Yard for a field trip designed to teach schoolchildren about railroad safety.
 Ryan Ahern as Ryan Scott, a railway employee and US Marine veteran of the war in Afghanistan who is injured in an attempt to stop the runaway.
 Jeff Wincott as Jesse Colson, Will's brother whom Will is living with at the start of the film.

Production
Unstoppable suffered various production challenges before filming could commence, including casting, schedule, location, and budgetary concerns.

In August 2004, Mark Bomback was hired by 20th Century Fox to write the screenplay Runaway Train. Robert Schwentke signed on to direct Runaway Train in August 2005, with plans to begin shooting in early 2006. In June 2007, Martin Campbell was in negotiations to replace Schwentke as director of the film, now titled Unstoppable. Campbell was attached until March 2009, when Tony Scott came on board as director. In April, both Denzel Washington and Chris Pine were attached to the project.

The original budget had been trimmed from $107 million to $100 million, but Fox wanted to reduce it to the low $90 million range, asking Scott to cut his salary from $9 million to $6 million and wanting Washington to shave $4 million off his $20 million fee. Washington declined and, although attached since April, formally withdrew from the project in July, citing lost patience with the film's lack of a start date. Fox made a modified offer as enticement, and he returned to the project two weeks later.

Production was headquartered in Pittsburgh, Pennsylvania, where the fictional "Allegheny and West Virginia Railroad" depicted in the movie is headquartered. Filming took place in a broad area around there including the Ohio cities of Martins Ferry, Bellaire, Mingo Junction, Steubenville, and Brewster, and in the Pennsylvania cities of Pittsburgh, Emporium, Milesburg, Tyrone, Julian, Unionville, Port Matilda, Bradford, Monaca, Eldred, Mill Hall, Turtlepoint, Port Allegany, and Carnegie, and also in Portville, New York and Olean, New York. The film is the most expensive ever to be shot in Western Pennsylvania.

The Western New York and Pennsylvania Railroad's Buffalo Line was used for two months during daylight, while the railroad ran its regular freight service at night. The real-life bridge and elevated curve in the climactic scene is the B & O Railroad Viaduct between Bellaire, Ohio and Benwood, West Virginia.

A two-day filming session took place at the Hooters restaurant in Wilkins Township, a Pittsburgh suburb, featuring 10 Hooters Girls from across the United States. Other interior scenes were shot at 31st Street Studios (then the Mogul Media Studios) on 31st Street in Pittsburgh. Principal photography began on August 31, 2009, for a release on November 12, 2010.

Filming was delayed for one day when part of the train accidentally derailed on November 21, 2009.

Locomotives
The locomotives used in the movie were borrowed from three railroads: the Canadian Pacific Railway (CP), the Wheeling and Lake Erie Railway (W&LE), and the Southwest Pennsylvania Railroad (SWP).

Four GE AC4400CWs leased from CP were used to depict the locomotives used on the runaway train, 777 and trailing unit 767. CP 9777 and 9758 played 777 and 767 in early scenes, and CP 9782 and 9751 were given a damaged look for later scenes. These four locomotives were repainted to standard colors in early 2010 by Canadian Pacific following the filming, but the black and yellow warning stripes from the AWVR livery painted on the plows of each locomotive were left untouched (except for 9777's plow) and remained visible on the locomotives.

Most of the other AWVR locomotives seen in the film, including chase locomotive 1206, and the locomotive consist used in an attempt to stop the train, 7375 and 7346, were played by EMD SD40-2s leased from W&LE. 1206 was depicted by three different SD40-2s: W&LE 6353 and 6354, and a third unit that was bought from scrap and modified for cab shots. 6353 and 6354 were returned to the W&LE and painted black to resume service, but 6354's windshield remains jutted forward from the AWVR livery. Judd Stewart's locomotive consist 7375 and 7346 were played by W&LE 6352 and 6351, which also played two locomotive "extras" (5624 and 5580), wearing the same grey livery with different running numbers. The Railroad Safety Campaign excursion train locomotive (RSC 2002) was played by a SWP EMD GP11 rebuilt from an EMD GP9. The two passenger coaches carrying schoolchildren were provided by the Orrville Railroad Heritage Society in Orrville, Ohio.

Inspiration

Unstoppable was inspired by the 2001 CSX 8888 incident, in which a runaway train ultimately traveled  through northwest Ohio. Led by CSX Transportation SD40-2 #8888, the train left Stanley Yard in Walbridge, Ohio with no one at the controls, after the hostler got out of the slow-moving train to correct a misaligned switch, mistakenly believing he had properly set the train's dynamic braking system, much as his counterpart (Dewey) in the film mistakenly believed he had properly set the locomotive's throttle (in the CSX incident, the locomotive had an older-style throttle stand where the same lever controlled both the throttle and the dynamic brakes; in fact, putting on "full throttle" and "full brakes" both involved advancing the same lever to the highest position after switching to a different operating mode. Thus if the engineer failed to properly switch modes, it was easy to accidentally apply full throttle instead of full brake, or vice-versa.)

Two of the train's tank cars contained thousands of gallons of molten phenol, a toxic ingredient used in glues, paints, and dyes. The chemical is very dangerous; it is highly corrosive to the skin, eyes, lungs, and nasal tract. Attempts to derail it using a portable derailer failed, and police had tried to engage the red fuel cutoff button by shooting at it; after having three shots mistakenly hit the red fuel cap, this ultimately had no effect because the button must be pressed for several seconds before the engine would be starved of fuel and shut down. For two hours, the train traveled at speeds up to  until the crew of a second locomotive, CSX #8392, coupled onto the runaway and slowly applied its brakes. The train was stopped at the Ohio State Route 31 crossing, just south-southeast of Kenton, Ohio. No one was seriously injured in the incident.

RSC 2002 was inspired by a CSX Operation Lifesaver passenger train, which was turning around at Stanley Yard and was preparing to head back south after having traveled north from Columbus to Walbridge using the same track CSX 8888 was now on. CSX ended up having to bus the safety train's 120 passengers back to the cities at which they had boarded, including Bowling Green, Findlay, and Kenton.

When the film was released, the Toledo Blade compared the events of the film to the real-life incident. "It's predictably exaggerated and dramatized to make it more entertaining," wrote David Patch, "but close enough to the real thing to support the 'Inspired by True Events' announcement that flashes across the screen at its start." He notes that the dead man switch would probably have worked in real life despite the unconnected brake hoses, unless the locomotive, or independent brakes, were already applied. As explained in the movie, the dead man's switch failed because the only available brakes were the independent brakes, which were quickly worn through, similar to CSX 8888. The film exaggerates the possible damage the phenol could have caused in a fire, and he found it incredible that the fictional AWVR freely disseminated information such as employees' names and images and the cause of the runaway to the media. In the real instance, he writes, the cause of the runaway was not disclosed until months later when the National Transportation Safety Board released its report, and CSX never made public the name of the engineer whose error caused the runaway, nor what disciplinary action was taken.

Soundtrack

The film score was composed by Harry Gregson-Williams and the soundtrack album was released on December 7, 2010.

Release
The film was scheduled on November 12, 2010 in the United States and Canada.

Marketing
A trailer was released online on August 6, 2010. The film went on general release on November 12, 2010.

Home media
Unstoppable was released on DVD and Blu-ray on February 15, 2011.

Reception

Critical response
On Rotten Tomatoes the film holds an approval rating of 87% certified fresh based on 193 reviews, with an average rating of 6.92/10. The site's critical consensus reads, "As fast, loud, and relentless as the train at the center of the story, Unstoppable is perfect popcorn entertainment—and director Tony Scott's best movie in years." Metacritic gives the film a weighted average score of 69 out of 100, based on 32 critics, indicating "generally favorable reviews".

Film critic Roger Ebert rated the film three and a half stars out of four, remarking in his review, "In terms of sheer craftsmanship, this is a superb film." In The New York Times, Manohla Dargis praised the film's visual style, saying that Scott "creates an unexpectedly rich world of chugging, rushing trains slicing across equally beautiful industrial and natural landscapes."

The Globe and Mail in Toronto was more measured. While the film's action scenes "have the greasy punch of a three-minute heavy-metal guitar solo", its critic felt the characters were weak. It called the film "an opportunistic political allegory about an economy that's out of control and industries that are weakened by layoffs, under-staffing, and corporate callousness."

Director Quentin Tarantino highlighted the film in a January 2020 episode of the Rewatchables podcast, and included it in his list of the ten best of the decade. In June 2021, he named it one of his favorite "Director's Final Films". Christopher Nolan also praised the film (particularly its use of suspense), citing it as an influence for his film Dunkirk.

Box office
Unstoppable was expected to take in about the same amount of money as the previous year's The Taking of Pelham 123, another Tony Scott film involving an out-of-control train starring Denzel Washington. Pelham took in $23.4 million during its opening weekend in the United States and Canada. Unstoppable had a strong opening night on Friday November 12, 2010, coming in ahead of Megamind with a gross of $8.1 million. However, Megamind won the weekend, earning $30 million to Unstoppables $23.9 million. Unstoppable performed slightly better than The Taking of Pelham 123 did in its opening weekend. As of April 2011, the film had earned $167,805,466 worldwide.

Awards
The film was nominated in the Best Sound Editing (Mark Stoeckinger) category at the 83rd Academy Awards and nominated for Teen Choice Award for Choice Movie – Action.

See also
 Atomic Train
 Narrow Margin
 Runaway Train
 The Bullet Train (1975) Japanese disaster film
 The Burning Train (1980) Indian film
 Silver Streak

References

External links

 
 
 
 
 Unstoppable at Metacritic
 

2010 films
2010 action thriller films
2010s disaster films
2010s survival films
20th Century Fox films
American films based on actual events
American action thriller films
American disaster films
American survival films
CSX Transportation
Disaster films based on actual events
Dune Entertainment films
2010s English-language films
Films about railway accidents and incidents
Films about the United States Marine Corps
Films directed by Tony Scott
Films scored by Harry Gregson-Williams
Films set in 2010
Films set in Pennsylvania
Films set in Pittsburgh
Films set on trains
Films shot in New York (state)
Films shot in Ohio
Films shot in Pittsburgh
Films with screenplays by Mark Bomback
Scott Free Productions films
Techno-thriller films
Thriller films based on actual events
2010s American films